Alfred Felber (19 September 1886 – 1967) was a Swiss rower who competed in the 1920 Summer Olympics and in the 1924 Summer Olympics.

In 1920 he won the bronze medal as member of the Swiss boat in the coxed pair competition. Four years later he won the gold medal with the Swiss boat in the same event.

References

External links
 
 
 

1886 births
1967 deaths
Swiss male rowers
Olympic rowers of Switzerland
Rowers at the 1920 Summer Olympics
Rowers at the 1924 Summer Olympics
Olympic gold medalists for Switzerland
Olympic bronze medalists for Switzerland
Olympic medalists in rowing
Medalists at the 1924 Summer Olympics
Medalists at the 1920 Summer Olympics
European Rowing Championships medalists
20th-century Swiss people